() is a strand of Welsh-language children's television programming, aimed at children between the ages of seven and thirteen.
 was launched on Monday 26 April 2010, replacing the former Welsh-language children's strand, .  is broadcast on the Welsh-language television channel S4C every weekday, from 4:00pm to 6:00pm, and on Saturdays (as) from 9:00am to 11:00am.

Programmes

(.)  Two families from the same area are challenged to prepare a special feast for a famous face in entertainment or sport. The children of the family decide the menu as the celebrities visit the two families before deciding which evening was the best. The winning family then receive the Gold  Trophy, and the losing side put on their rubber gloves and wash the dirty dishes.

is a children's room makeover series, presented by Alun Williams, along with designer, Leah Hughes, and her team of handymen - Iwan Llechid Owen, Gwyn Eiddior Parry and Ioan Marc Thomas.

(.)  presenter Tudur Phillips volunteers to take part in a range of experiments in the extreme science lab – under the guidance of scientific experts.

(English:Are you Game?)
The viewers are responsible for this sporting series, where different sports clubs in the limelight each week. Members of these clubs then offer training tips to those who want to learn about a new skill as well as putting different kinds of tools to the test – from frisbees to surfboards.

Anifeiliad a Fi
(.) From mountain sheep to hamsters and goldfish, three children from the Bala, Aberystwyth and Swansea areas take a look at animals that live among them, in their areas. Each week the trio visit children who either keep pets or live on a farm. The series also follows children who compete with their animals, and pay a weekly visit to vet Kate Thomas at work in the Aberystwyth area.

(.)
Each programme, contains two energetic hours full of comedy, interactivity, competitions, fun and mischief. This programme reaches anarchic and silly heights with the help of a team of young people, and celebrity, studio guests.

Other programmes

Other programmes broadcast as part of  include:
  -
  -
  -
  -
  -
  -
  -
  -
  - 
  -
  -
  -
  - ({{Langnf|cy||More of Saturday 'Stwnsh'''|links=no}})
  -
  -
  -
  -
  -
  -
  -
  -
  -
  -
  -
  -
  -
  -
  -

Websites

The  website plays a key role in the service. The applications available on this website include; games, series information, and downloading. The website also offers viewers the chance to watch programmes from the  service online.

The  online service is available in both Welsh and English. The Clic service website is also available in Welsh and English and this website also enables viewers to view subtitles in either Welsh or English.

See alsoHacio'', Welsh language current affairs programme, for young people.
Cyw, strand of Welsh language programming, for younger children.
Cúla 4, strand of Irish language programming for children.

Notes

References

Television programming blocks in Europe
British children's television series
S4C original programming